Chen Xiaonan (born November 13, 1973) is a Chinese talk show host. Chen Xiaonan began working at Beijing Television and CCTV at 1994, and joined Phoenix Television at 2000.

See also
 A Date with Luyu

References

1973 births
Living people
Tencent people
Place of birth missing (living people)
CCTV television presenters